Route 82 could refer to:

 any of the highways numbered 82
 London Buses route 82
 Melbourne tram route 82